Munder is a village in the southern state of Karnataka, India. It is located in the Karla taluk of Udupi district in Karnataka.

According to 2011 census, Munder had a population of 5,747 with 2,581 males and 3,166 females. 

An annual Ter (car festival) happens on 6th day of Maayi tingolu according to Tulu calendar and it falls every year on 17 or 18th of February. Maarnemi and Deepothsavam are other special days.  Jalaka (dipping in river shambhavi) takes place on the next day of the Ter (Rathotsava).

References

Further reading

 
 
 
 

Villages in Udupi district